Sophronia consanguinella is a moth of the family Gelechiidae. It was described by Gottlieb August Wilhelm Herrich-Schäffer in 1854. It is found in Germany, Austria, the Czech Republic, Slovakia, Hungary, Bulgaria, Ukraine and Russia.

References

Moths described in 1854
Sophronia (moth)